Cornelius Johannes 'Kleintjie' Grobler  (24 August 1944  – 29 September 1999) was a South African rugby union player.

Playing career
Grobler made his provincial debut for Northern Transvaal in 1966 and also played provincial rugby for the Free State and Western Transvaal.

Grobler played his first test match for the Springboks as eighthman in the fourth test against the 1974 Lions at Ellis Park in Johannesburg. He toured with the Springboks to France at the end of 1974, without playing in any test matches and in 1975 he played in both tests against France during their tour of South Africa. Grobler played three tests, scoring one try and also four tour matches, scoring two tries for South Africa.

Test history

See also
List of South Africa national rugby union players – Springbok no.  478

References

1944 births
1999 deaths
South African rugby union players
South Africa international rugby union players
Blue Bulls players
Free State Cheetahs players
Leopards (rugby union) players
Rugby union players from Pretoria